The de Havilland DH.53 Humming Bird is a British single-seat, single-engine, low-wing monoplane light aircraft first flown in the 1920s.

Design and development
In response to the Daily Mail Light Aeroplane Competition of 1923 de Havilland built two DH.53s which were named Humming Bird and Sylvia II. The DH.53 was a low-wing single-seat monoplane powered by a Douglas  motorcycle engine. At Lympne, in October 1923, the DH.53s did not win any prizes but gave an impressive performance. After the trial, Humming Bird was reengined with a  Blackburne Tomtit two-cylinder engine, and the aircraft was fitted with a revised undercarriage. The Air Ministry became interested in the design and ordered eight Tomtit-powered aircraft in 1924 as communications and training aircraft for the Royal Air Force.

Early in 1924 twelve aircraft were built at Stag Lane Aerodrome and were named Humming Bird after the first prototype. Eight aircraft were for the Air Ministry order, three were for export to Australia, and one was exported to Avia in Prague. One further aircraft was later built for an order from Russia.

Operational service

The first six aircraft for the Royal Air Force all made their public debut at the 1925 display at RAF Hendon, where they were raced against each other. The last two aircraft would later be used for "parasite aircraft" trials being launched from below an airship – the R.33. The aircraft were retired in 1927 and all eight were sold as civil aircraft.

Operators

Royal Air Force

Aircraft on display
G-EBHX, the prototype, was airworthy and on display at the Shuttleworth Collection, but crashed on 1 July 2012, killing the pilot.
J7326 fuselage is on display at the de Havilland Aircraft Heritage Centre.

Specifications

See also

References

Citations

Bibliography

Humming Bird
Single-engined tractor aircraft
1920s British civil utility aircraft
1920s British military trainer aircraft
Parasite aircraft
Low-wing aircraft
Aircraft first flown in 1923